Armand Michael Cappelletti (April 18, 1938 – November 14, 2013) was an American lawyer most widely known as a bridge player and poker authority.

Cappelletti was born in Providence, Rhode Island, the son of carpenter Armand "Mondo" Cappelletti and Rose Marie (née Pugliese). Both sets of his grandparents were born in Italy.

He later lived in Alexandria, Virginia, where he practiced for the U.S. Department of Justice and later as a public defender in Washington, D.C. Among poker players he is known as the author of the books Cappelletti on Omaha, The Best of Cappelletti on Omaha, Poker at the Millennium and How to Win at Omaha High-Low Poker, and also as columnist for the poker magazine, CardPlayer. He is well known among bridge players as the inventor of the Cappelletti convention. Cappelletti was an American Contract Bridge League (ACBL) Grand Life Master with more than 24,000 masterpoints. He won a bronze medal in the 1974 World Mixed Teams. Cappelletti also authored the book 100 Bridge Problems: Using Poker Tactics in Contract Bridge.

Cappelletti made some contributions to bridge bidding including Cappelletti over notrump, Cappelletti over one-of-a-major doubled, Cappelletti two-suited cuebids.

Bridge accomplishments

Wins
 North American Bridge Championships (2)
 Master Mixed Teams (1) 1967
 Silver Ribbon Pairs (1) 2013

Runners-up
 North American Bridge Championships (7)
 Reisinger (1) 1991
 Men's Board-a-Match Teams (1) 1979
 North American Swiss Teams (1) 1985
 Blue Ribbon Pairs (2) 1973, 1977
 Mixed Pairs (2) 1967, 1988
 Other notable 2nd places:
 Goldman Pairs (1) 1968

Personal life 
Mike's son, Michael Cappellitti Jr., is a Bridge professional.

References

External links
 
 

1938 births
2013 deaths
People from Providence, Rhode Island
American people of Italian descent
American contract bridge players
Contract bridge writers
American poker players
Lawyers from Alexandria, Virginia
Public defenders
20th-century American lawyers